Orocrambus callirrhous is a moth in the family Crambidae. It was described by Edward Meyrick in 1883. It is endemic to New Zealand. It has been recorded from the eastern and central part of the South Island and the coast near Wellington and Whangārei on the North Island.

The wingspan is 24–32 mm. Adults have been recorded on wing from December to April.

The larvae feed on Festuca novaezealandiae.

References

Crambinae
Moths described in 1883
Taxa named by Edward Meyrick
Moths of New Zealand
Endemic fauna of New Zealand
Endemic moths of New Zealand